Inniskeen, officially Inishkeen, is a small village, townland and parish in County Monaghan, Ireland, close to the County Louth and County Armagh borders. Seven townlands of this Roman Catholic Diocese of Clogher parish lie within County Louth. Jack Mulholland and James Meegan are the official fathers and priests of the roman catholic church in this village (Inniskeen)

History

This territory had been inhabited from the late Neolithic/Early Bronze Age. Rock art carvings (Petroglyphs) have been discovered in adjoining townlands (including Drumirril) dating to 3000 BC. Cup and ring marks with concentric circles are the main inscriptions. They have been excavated by UCD School of Archaeology. Finds on the site ranged from late Neolithic to the early Christian period. These included ancient cooking places known as Fulachta Fiadh. Unlike Newgrange the carvings are on the bedrock and not part of a constructed monument. It is not open to public viewing, A Bronze Age cyst grave was also discovered in Inniskeen Glebe townland.

A monastery was founded here in the 6th century by Saint Daigh MacCarell which was burned in 789, plundered by the Vikings in 948, and burned a second time in 1166.  The bottom third of the round tower remains. In this drumlin country, many of the hilltops have hill forts and associated souterrains which date from the late Iron Age or early Christian era. The country was part of McMahon Clann territory and displaced Carrolls in the 9th century as the dominant force in the area.

The arrival of the Normans saw the construction of a motte-and-bailey in the 13th century. The motte is still standing. The arrival of the Augustinian order of monks saw the construction of a new monastery of that order as a branch of the Abbey at Louth. One section of its wall remains adjoining the graveyard in the field adjoining the Motte.

Robert Devereux, 2nd Earl of Essex was granted the Barony of Farney, including Inniskeen, by Queen Elizabeth I of England in the late 16th century. These lands devolved to Viscount Weymouth. The Marquess of Bath sold this estate to the tenants in the 1880s under the land Acts.

In 1806, the first record of Hurling/Football in Inniskeen as Monaghan beat Louth in a match which is celebrated in the Irish poem Iommain Iniis Chaoin.

The GNR(I) Inniskeen railway station opened on 1 April 1851, closed for passenger traffic on 14 October 1957 and finally closed altogether on 1 January 1960. It was on the Dundalk to Enniskillen line was a junction for the Carrickmacross line.

More recently, during The Troubles in Northern Ireland, because it is adjacent to Crossmaglen, some people were involved with the Provisional IRA campaign.

Patrick Kavanagh Centre
The Patrick Kavanagh Centre is set up to commemorate the poet Patrick Kavanagh. The Centre houses exhibitions outlining Kavanagh's life story and local history. The Patrick Kavanagh Centre is housed in this former Roman Catholic church, St Mary's. This building, which dates from 1820, was deconsecrated in 1974 when a new parish church was built.

Patrick Kavanagh was baptised here, attended regular Mass and served as an altar boy here in his youth. St Mary's Church features in his novel, Tarry Flynn, and also in the semi-autobiographical, The Green Fool.

Patrick Kavanagh is buried in the adjoining churchyard, along with his wife Katherine Moloney Kavanagh, his brother Peter, and his sisters Anne and Mary.

Patrick Kavanagh, one of Ireland's greatest poets, was born in Inniskeen in 1904. This exhibition honours his life, his writing, and his continuing legacy. Kavanagh's universal themes of Soul, Love, Beauty, Nature and God are timeless and will resonate in the hearts of readers of all ages for many generations to come. It is located in the former St Mary's Church, a former Catholic church, in whose adjoining graveyard Kavanagh and his wife are buried.

Sports clubs
Inniskeen's Gaelic Athletic Association club is called the Inniskeen Grattans. It was founded in 1883 predating the founding of the GAA in 1884. Its jersey colours are red and green. The club opened a new stadium in 2008. They won the first County Championship, in August 1888. They later played Cavan champions Maghera Mac Finns in the first Ulster final in Drogheda which ended in a draw, but won the replay in December making it the first-ever Ulster S.F. champions. It also won the Senior Championship Final in 1905, 1938, 1947 and 1948. In 2005 the club won the Monaghan (beating Doohamlet) and Ulster Intermediate Club Football Championships after def. In the Monaghan Championship defeating Doohamlet in Clontibret and in Ulster, defeating Glenswilly in Enniskillen. The club were defeated in the Senior Hurling Shield final by Clontibret in Monaghan. Inniskeen was represented by Fergal Duffy when Monaghan won the National League Div. 2 in Croke Park. In 2006 Inniskeen won the All-Ireland Intermediate Club Championship by defeating Caherlistrane GAC ar Croke Park.

Inniskeen Pitch & Putt club has an 18-hole course on the banks of the River Fane.

People
Oliver Callan (b.1980), satirist and comedian from RTÉ Radio 1 programme Callan's Kicks.
Patrick Kavanagh (1904–1967), regarded as one of the foremost Irish poets of the 20th century, was born and grew up in Inniskeen. He is buried in Inniskeen graveyard.
Peter Kavanagh (1916–2006), brother of Patrick, was a writer, scholar and publisher, who collected, edited, and published the works of Patrick Kavanagh. He is also buried in Inniskeen graveyard.
Heber MacMahon (1600–1650), Lord Bishop of Clogher, commander of the Catholic Confederate forces at the Battle of Scarrifholis.
William P Quinn (1900–1978) was the first Commissioner of the Garda Síochána to rise through the ranks from ordinary Garda when he was appointed in February 1965.

See also
 List of towns and villages in Ireland
 List of abbeys and priories in County Monaghan

References

External links
Inniskeen Grattans GAC website 
St Daigh's National School project
Hearth Rolls Hearth Money Rolls for Inniskeen parishe 1663–1665
Inniskeen or Enniskeen - description from Lewis's Topographical Dictionary of Ireland, 1837

Towns and villages in County Monaghan
Townlands of County Monaghan
Late Neolithic